Llyn Idwal is a small lake (approximately 800 m by 300 m, or 28 acres) that lies within Cwm Idwal in the Glyderau mountains of Snowdonia.

It is named after Prince Idwal Foel, a grandson of Rhodri Mawr, one of the ancient Kings of Wales. Legend states that the king's unfortunate offspring was murdered by being drowned in the lake. In fact Idwal Foel died in battle against the Saxons in 942 and an alternate version claims that he was cremated beside the lake, as was the burial custom for Celtic nobility.

A number of small streams flow into Llyn Idwal from around Cwm Idwal. One small river flows out and joins the Afon Ogwen river at Pont Pen-y-Benglog near Ogwen Cottage, immediately above the Rhaeadr Ogwen waterfall.

Paths
The lake is easily accessible on foot via a 900-metre long stone-paved path from Ogwen Cottage on the main A5 road. Another path encircles the lake. Two paths lead from opposite sides of the lake to the top of the ridge close to the Twll Du (Devil's Kitchen), but these paths become rather steep in places. They lead to Glyder Fach and Glyder Fawr.

There is a small pebble beach at the northwest edge of Llyn Idwal which is occasionally used by visitors for recreation, including bathing in the summer months. As a mountain lake, the waters can be cold and care should be taken by swimmers not to go out beyond their depths.

The lake lies wholly within Gwynedd County, although the eastern edge forms the boundary between the counties of Gwynedd and Conwy.

References

External links 

www.geograph.co.uk : photos of Llyn Idwal and surrounding area

Capel Curig
Llandygai
Idwal
Tourism in Conwy County Borough
Idwal
Tourism in Gwynedd
Idwal
Tourism in Snowdonia
Ramsar sites in Wales